George Wallace (1919–1998) was Governor of Alabama and a former candidate for President of the United States.

George Wallace may also refer to:

George Wallace (film), 1997 film based on the life of the Alabama governor
George Wallace (Georgia politician) (died 1881), African-American state senator in Georgia during reconstruction
George Wallace Jr. (born 1951), American politician, son of Governor George Wallace, and former Alabama State Treasurer
George Wallace (advocate) (1727–1805), Scottish jurist, son of Robert Wallace
George Wallace (American football), one of Fordham University's earliest football coaches
George Wallace (American comedian) (born 1952), American actor, comedian and screenwriter
George Wallace (Australian comedian) (1895–1960), Australian comedian, vaudevillian, radio personality and actor
George Wallace (English cricketer) (1854–1927), English cricketer
George Wallace (New Zealand cricketer) (1913–1997), New Zealand cricketer
George Wallace (diplomat) (born 1938), Liberian foreign minister, 2006–2007
George Wallace, Baron Wallace of Coslany (1906–2003), British Labour MP for Chislehurst 1945–50, Norwich North 1964–74
George D. Wallace (1917–2005), American actor
George Leonard Wallace (1918–1968), Australian comedian, vaudevillian, television personality and actor
George Scott Wallace (1929–2011), British Columbia physician and politician
George W. Wallace (1872–1946), U.S. army officer
George E. Wallace (born 1938), mayor of Hampton, Virginia
Watty Wallace (George Walter Gordon Wallace, 1900–1964), member of the Queensland Legislative Assembly

See also

 George Wallace Bollinger (1890–1917), diarist and WWI New Zealand soldier
 
 George (disambiguation)
 Wallace (disambiguation)